The women's hammer throw at the 2016 European Athletics Championships took place at the Olympic Stadium on 6 and 8 July.

Records

Schedule

Results

Qualification

Qualification: 70.00 m (Q) or best 12 (q)

Final

References

External links
 amsterdam2016.org, official championship site

Hammer Throw W
Hammer throw at the European Athletics Championships
2016 in women's athletics